MHz is the International Standard symbol for megahertz.  

MHZ is the IATA airport code for RAF Mildenhall in Suffolk, England.

MHz may also refer to: 

"MHz" (episode), an episode of the Paranoia Agent anime series
MHz Legacy, an American hip hop group formerly known as MHz
MHz myth, referring to the clock speed of computers
MHz Networks
MHz WorldView

See also
Megahertz (disambiguation)